Rockridge Market Hall is a market hall opened in 1987 in Rockridge, a neighborhood of Oakland, California. It contains nine stores, including a caterer, a specialty foods shop, a flower shop, a wine shop, a produce shop, a coffee roaster, a fish shop, a butcher shop and a bakery. The food hall is across from the Rockridge BART station. The neighborhood is noted for its concentration of upscale retail and food establishments.

External links
Rockridge Market Hall website

Buildings and structures in Oakland, California
Food markets in the United States
Shopping malls in the San Francisco Bay Area
Shopping malls in Alameda County, California
Shopping malls established in 1987